Yves Saint Laurent SAS, also known as Saint Laurent and YSL, is a French luxury fashion house founded in 1962 by Yves Saint Laurent and his partner, Pierre Bergé. The company specializes in haute couture, ready-to-wear, leather accessories, and footwear. Its cosmetics line, YSL Beauty, is owned by L'Oréal.

History 

The eponymous brand was established in 1962 by designer Yves Saint Laurent and his partner, Pierre Bergé. The brand's logos were designed in 1963 by A. M. Cassandre. During the 1960s and 1970s, YSL popularized the beatnik look, safari jackets, tight pants, and thigh-high boots. In 1966, YSL debuted Le Smoking, a tuxedo suit for women. In an attempt to democratize fashion, YSL began producing ready-to-wear in 1966, with its launch of Rive Gauche, and is considered to be the first to popularize the concept. YSL's designs often featured designs influenced from traditional Chinese clothing, as well as themes from Pop Art, Ballets Russes, and Picasso. Saint Laurent is credited with initiating the broad, shoulder-padded style in 1978, that would go on to characterize 1980s fashion. Saint Laurent's muses included Loulou de La Falaise, Betty Catroux, Talitha Pol-Getty, and Catherine Deneuve.

The brand expanded in the 1980s, and early 1990s, with men's and women's fragrances, and its cosmetic line in 1978. However, by 1992, the company's profits were in decline and its share price had fallen. In 1993, Saint Laurent was sold to pharmaceuticals company Sanofi.

In 1997, Pierre Bergé appointed Hedi Slimane as collections and art director and relaunched Rive Gauche Homme. Slimane departed two years later to head couture menswear at Dior Homme.

In 1999, Kering purchased YSL and hired Tom Ford to design the wonderful ready-to-wear collection, while Yves Saint Laurent himself would design the haute couture collection.  Designs by Tom Ford For YSL were chosen Dress of the Year by the Fashion Museum in 2001 and 2004.

In 2002, after years of poor health, drug abuse, depression, alcoholism, and criticisms of YSL designs, Saint Laurent closed the couture division of YSL. "Chanel freed women, and Saint Laurent gave them power," Pierre Bergé was quoted, reflecting on his career and impact on fashion, "I created the contemporary woman's wardrobe." In 2004, Tom Ford departed the company and Stefano Pilati, an Italian-born designer became creative director. Yves Saint Laurent died of brain cancer in 2008. The following few years proved to be tumultuous for the company, with YSL stores closing in the key U.S. markets of San Francisco and New York (including the company's Madison Avenue location, its first-ever store in the United States). In January 2010, its Chicago boutique on Oak Street also closed.

In 2012, Kering announced Hedi Slimane replaced Stefano Pilati as creative director for YSL. Slimane previously worked with Dior Homme until 2007. In 2015, Slimane announced he would revive Yves Saint Laurent's couture line. In 2016, Slimane left Saint Laurent and Anthony Vaccarello was appointed creative director, a position he still holds as of August 2022.

Despite Slimane previously working with the house, there was controversy following his appointment, particularly after the announcement the ready-to-wear line would be rebranded “Saint Laurent” (dropping “Yves” from its name). ”Yves Saint Laurent” and the YSL vertical monogram logo would remain for accessories and its L’Oréal-owned cosmetics line. Slimane drew inspiration for the name change from the ready-to-wear line Rive Gauche’s name when it first launched, “Saint Laurent Rive Gauche”. Parisian boutique Colette began selling shirts with the line "Ain't Laurent without Yves." Saint Laurent requested the store stop selling the shirts (which it did on its online store). In October 2013, Colette received a letter from YSL accusing it of selling counterfeit products that seriously damaged the brand. Following the accusation, Saint Laurent canceled Colette's order for its Spring 2014 Collection, despite Colette stocking the brand since 1998.

After his appointment, Slimane moved the design studio to Los Angeles, Slimane's home; the couture atelier would remain in France. The company revived its haute couture collection in 2015, under Slimane.

In April 2016, Anthony Vaccarello was appointed creative director. In 2017, Vaccarello chose Charlotte Gainsbourg, daughter of Serge Gainsbourg and Jane Birkin, as face of the A/W 2017 campaign. In 2019, Saint Laurent launched its lifestyle-brand Rive Droite, in which exclusive merchandise, collector's items, and curated experiences are made available at Paris and Los Angeles. In 2021,  Rive Droite debuted Te ride, a collection in collaboration with Super73, consisting of an electric bike, skateboards, and surfboards, and Live Sessions, a platform for emerging musicians to perform for a digital audience.

References

External links 
 

 
Clothing brands of France
Clothing companies of France
Clothing retailers of France
Fashion accessory brands
Luxury brands
High fashion brands
Cosmetics brands
Cosmetics companies of France
Eyewear brands of France
Jewellery retailers of France
Perfume houses
Shoe companies of France
Companies based in Paris
Clothing companies established in 1962
Design companies established in 1962
Retail companies established in 1962
French companies established in 1962
Comité Colbert members
Gucci brands
Cigarette brands
1980s fashion
1990s fashion
2000s fashion
2010s fashion
2020s fashion